Gitta Escher (later Sommer then Wagenknecht, born 18 March 1957) is a German former gymnast. She competed at the 1976 Summer Olympics in all artistic gymnastics events and won a bronze medal in the team competition. Individually she finished fifth in the vault and sixth in the floor exercise, balance beam and all-around.

After retirement from competition she worked as a gymnastics coach at her club SV Halle.

References

1957 births
Sportspeople from Thuringia
Living people
German female artistic gymnasts
Olympic gymnasts of East Germany
Gymnasts at the 1976 Summer Olympics
Olympic bronze medalists for East Germany
Olympic medalists in gymnastics
People from Nordhausen, Thuringia
Medalists at the 1976 Summer Olympics